Saint-Henri was a provincial electoral district in the Montreal region of Quebec, Canada.

It corresponded to Saint-Henri neighbourhood and surrounding area in Montreal.

It was created for the 1966 election from part of Montréal–Saint-Henri. Its final election was in 1989.  It disappeared in the 1994 election and its successor electoral district was Saint-Henri–Sainte-Anne.

Members of the Legislative Assembly / National Assembly

References
 Election results (National Assembly)
 Election results (QuebecPolitique.com)

Former provincial electoral districts of Quebec